{{Infobox writer
|name         = Joseph A. Tunzi
|image        = 
|caption      =
|birth_name   = Joseph Anthony Tunzi
|birth_date   = 
|birth_place  = Chicago, Illinois, U.S.
|occupation   = Author, publisher, self-publisher, producer, researcher, archivist, historian
|genre        = Music, rock 'n'roll, Elvis Presley, Beatles, Frank Sinatra, Muhammad Ali
|period       = 1988–present
|notableworks = Elvis Sessions III The Recorded Music of Elvis Aron Presley 1953-1977 (2004)68 At 40:Retrospective (2008)|website      = 
|awards       =
}}

Joseph Anthony Tunzi (born July 25, 1953) is an American, Chicago, Illinois-based author, publisher, and producer. He has been described as "a renowned author from Chicago" and "one of the foremost authorities on Elvis Presley," authoring, self-publishing, and producing over 60 titles about Presley, amongst others, for the past 35 years. Tunzi has also compiled a massive photo archive, from which he licenses photographs of Presley.

Adam Victor referred to Tunzi in his 2008 publication, The Elvis Encyclopedia as "one of the world's most prolific Elvis authors, with more than twenty books to his name, specializing in photo books about specific events and tours through his own publishing operation, J.A.T. Productions." Victor went on to write in The Elvis Encyclopedia that "many of Tunzi's books feature exclusive interviews and recordings and that he has also published a number of DVD titles, including the Elvis Presley Hot Shots and Cool Clips series."AMICI Journal wrote of Tunzi, "deciding to focus purely on his writing and publishing, building a huge archive of photos, every book Tunzi has released has included a plethora of rare photographs. With their beautiful layouts, and accurate information, Tunzi quickly built a reputation as a top writer and archivist."

Tunzi is listed under American Authors on NobelAuthors.com .

Additionally, Tunzi has been interviewed by several television and radio programs as well as for several newspaper articles and websites throughout his career. Between 1972 and 1977, Tunzi routinely was a guest commentator on Roy Leonard's radio program on WGN, often offering opinions on Elvis Presley's latest record releases and Elvis' personal concert appearances, films and television specials he had recently witnessed, among other subjects. Tunzi also regularly appeared as a guest on Jay Gordon's radio program Elvis Only. Tunzi has been a guest on Sirius Satellite Radio's Elvis Radio (Channel 19), having been interviewed while in Memphis as well as via the telephone. Tunzi has been interviewed on several occasions by Robert Alaniz's "Collecting The King" YouTube channel.Archived at Ghostarchive and the Wayback Machine: Archived at Ghostarchive and the Wayback Machine:  Many of Tunzi's books are featured in libraries both in the United States and throughout the world. On January 2, 2023, Tunzi appeared on That Classic Rock Show, hosted by Jim Summaria and Mark Plotnick to discuss Elvis Presley on WHRU-LP (101.5 FM broadcast band - Huntley Community Radio), a low-power radio station licensed to serve Huntley, Illinois.

 Early career 
Tunzi worked at several radio stations in the Chicago area between 1972 and 1982 as an account executive in charge of selling radio advertisements. Tunzi's early work in radio meant that he was constantly attending learning seminars which gave him the equivalent of a college degree. He also owned Records For A Song, a Chicago area record shop in the late seventies. In 1982, he formed his own publishing company, which up until 1987 strictly dealt with direct mail advertising. By 1985, Tunzi had stopped working for radio stations and began focusing his efforts towards becoming an entrepreneur in direct mail advertising.

 First book 
By 1988 his company, JAT Publishing (name derived from his initials), diverted its efforts towards self-publishing books that eventually evolved to primarily featuring rare photographs of Elvis Presley throughout his life and career. His first self-published book, though, The First Elvis Video Price And Reference Guide, was a parody of the various price guides that were coming into the collectibles market at the time. As Mike Eder noted in his article, A Look At Joseph A. Tunzi in AMICI Journal (National Italian American Celebrity Magazine), "Feeling many of the values to be arbitrary, and also amused by the huge amount of publications, Joseph decided to do a parody price guide on Elvis Presley's videos." As Eder further elaborated, "Tunzi deliberately used subtle humor to test out his theory that these guides were being given too much relevance in collectors' circles." Steven Opdyke wrote in 1999 that "Tunzi had another claim to fame. In 1988, he compiled the first Elvis Presley video guide. It contained listings of movie prints, promotional tapes and foreign releases as part of its lengthy presentations. It also had pricing information, which was especially useful for obtaining items with limited distribution."

 Photo journals 
Beginning with Elvis, Encore Performance (Chicago 1972) and continuing to this day, Tunzi has written and self-published numerous photo journals on Presley. As Opdyke elaborated in his book, The Printed Elvis: The Complete Guide To Books About The King, "one can only say that Joseph Tunzi (like Elvis biographer Bill E. Burk) has done a ton of work on Elvis. Each book (all from a nineties perspective) has been limited to a specific time period in Elvis' career, concentrating on the music and performances. Taken together, they formed one of the most in-depth chronicles of the King's career from the late sixties forward."

Tunzi was also a forerunner in using newspaper photography from many award-winning photographers in his publications. Some of these photographers included Jack Lenahan of the Chicago Sun-Times newspaper, Bob Fila of the Chicago Tribune, Dean T. Musser of the Fort Wayne, Indiana's The Journal Gazette, Hank de Lespinasse, whose photos have appeared in publications such as Newsweek, Time (magazine), Fortune (magazine) and Sports Illustrated, Ken Ross of the Memphis Press-Scimitar and George Wilson of the Oklahoma Journal.

Tunzi has also had a number of individuals that are mostly well known in the Elvis fandom who knew or worked with Elvis Presley in some capacity write introductions for his books. These individuals include former RCA executive and producer Joan Deary and Bruce E. Banke, former director of publicity / public relations for what was formerly the International Hotel and Las Vegas Hilton but today is known as Westgate Las Vegas. Others include pianist Glen Hardin, keyboardist and producer David Briggs (American musician), guitarist James Burton, drummers Ron Tutt and Hal Blaine, costume designer Bill Belew (foreword only), bassist Duke Bardwell, television producer and director Steve Binder, backup vocalist Ray Walker (singer) of The Jordanaires, television producer and director Marty Pasetta, broadcaster Frank Page (broadcaster) (foreword only), radio personality Jerry G. Bishop, guitarist Scotty Moore and recording sound engineers Bill Porter (sound engineer) and Al Pachucki.

In 2003, Tunzi's JAT Publishing published Russ Howe and Tom Salva's book of photographs of Elvis Presley performing at Nassau Coliseum on June 22–23, 1973.

Beginning with his twentieth year, 2008, Tunzi began publishing all of his latest books in hardback format, though he has recently reverted to publishing some titles in softcover format. That same year, he also published television producer Steve Binder's memoir,  '68 At 40: Retrospective, of producing the Singer Presents Elvis television special. This television special is commonly referred to as the '68 Comeback Special. Later, '''68 At 40: Retrospective was reprinted in soft-cover format as well.

 Elvis Sessions: The Recorded Music of Elvis Aron Presley 1953-1977 
In 1993, Tunzi self-published the first edition in a series of books titled Elvis Sessions: The Recorded Music of Elvis Aron Presley 1953-1977 based on Elvis Presley's recording sessions / live recordings. Two further volumes followed in 1996 and 2004. These books have documented the musicians and backup vocalists who performed with Presley as well as some unreleased recordings. Booklist wrote of Tunzi's first Elvis Sessions book, "Elvis Sessions encompasses the King's musical career from his first commercial sides for Sun Records in 1954 through his final concert recordings in June, 1977, two months before his death. This terrain is traversed in Reconsider Baby: The Definitive Elvis Sessionography (rev. ed. 1986) but Tunzi also includes material that surfaced recently." American Libraries wrote of Tunzi's first edition of Elvis Sessions, "The genuine musical genius of Elvis Presley, has, to a large degree, been obscured by the tragic excesses of his last years and the seemingly inexhaustible supply of tabloid drivel about him. Elvis Sessions: The Recorded Music of Elvis Aron Presley 1953-1977 eschews such nonsense and sticks with the facts about Elvis's recording career, resulting in a solid bit of American pop music history."

One of the unreleased recordings by Presley that Tunzi documented in Elvis Sessions II: The Recorded Music of Elvis Aron Presley 1953-1977 was an acetate recording he personally owned of "A Little Less Conversation" originally thought to have been made in June 1968 during the production of the Singer Presents...ELVIS NBC television special. However, it has since been determined that this acetate recording was actually an alternate take made in March 1968 during the soundtrack recording sessions for the 1968 Metro-Goldwyn-Mayer motion picture, Live a Little, Love a Little. A backing track of "A Little Less Conversation" from the Live a Little, Love a Little recording sessions was submitted for the Singer Presents...ELVIS special but ultimately was not used, which lead to some of the confusion regarding the date of the acetate recording. In the mid-nineties, Tunzi sold to Bertelsmann Music Group (now owned by Sony Music) the unreleased recording that first appeared on the 1998 double album Memories: The '68 Comeback Special and was later used in the 2001 Warner Brothers motion picture Ocean's Eleven and ultimately remixed by DJ Junkie XL. This remix became a worldwide number one hit, part of a marketing campaign for Nike, Inc.'s "Secret Tournament" Scorpion KO during the 2002 World Cup and a bonus track on the chart-topping compilation ELV1S: 30 #1 Hits.

Opdyke also wrote of Tunzi's first two volumes, "Tunzi's 1993 'sessions' book first came out through mail order only. Recently it appeared in a revised edition (412 pages) that quickly became even more useful than the first. There were many great photos along with endless appendices covering gold and platinum records, concert lists, and even a limited bootleg section."

In November 2016, Jeremy Roberts wrote an article detailing Elvis' connection to guitarist and entertainer Glen Campbell and the fact that Campbell has been erroneously cited for several years as having played guitar on the recording sessions that produced the title song, "Viva Las Vegas" of Presley's 1964 film. However, the article points out that after contacting Tunzi, it is clear that Campbell played on Elvis' cover recording of Ray Charles' "What'd I Say" which was also featured in the film.

Tunzi has also written and published Elvis No. 1 - The Complete Chart History Of Elvis Presley, which details Elvis Presley's chart numbers on the various charts in both Billboard and Cashbox.

A fourth volume of Elvis Sessions is currently being worked on.

Television, compact disc and DVD releases
In 1997, Tunzi was part of an Elvis Presley twentieth anniversary Blockbuster Video television commercial which featured photographs from his own photo agency. In one of the rare occasions, Tunzi was physically credited for photo usage in the television commercial. This commercial promoted an exclusive Elvis Presley compact disc being sold at Blockbuster Video.

Over the years, his company, JAT Publishing, has expanded to produce several compact disc and DVD titles. He has also written and published three projects featuring the Beatles. These projects included a book titled Beatles '65 which featured the only four known candid color paparazzi photographs taken of Elvis Presley and the members of the Beatles on August 27, 1965. Ken Sharp wrote a column piece titled Rock Report in Friday Morning Quarterback of Tunzi's Beatles '65 that "the 96-page book draws together exciting and dramatic photographs of the Beatles in concert and at press conferences. Photographs of fans at shows, experiencing the complete electrical shock of "Beatlemania" is also included." Included with this project was Elvis Sings Beatles Songs, the first officially sanctioned compact disc release to feature all of Elvis Presley's cover recordings of songs written and originally recorded by the Beatles. Derek Page wrote a review of Tunzi's Beatles '65 in Beatlefan magazine in which he ended his review by saying that Beatles '65 was "all in all, a marvelous look at The Beatles in their touring prime."

The second project Tunzi did on the Beatles was Beatles '64: Goin' To Kansas City which was simply a smaller photo booklet accompanying a CD featuring the audio of a previously unreleased Beatles press conference on September 17, 1964. The third project featuring the Beatles was the book titled 1964: The Year That...Changed America & Me. This book featured black & white photographs of The Beatles arrival in the United States of America on February 7, 1964, black and white and color photographs of the Beatles rehearsing and performing during their first three appearances on The Ed Sullivan Show, black and white and color photographs of the group meeting boxer Cassius Clay, later known as Muhammad Ali, while he was in Miami, Florida training for his February 25, 1964 bout with Sonny Liston, and lastly black and white photographs of the band at a press conference as well as during a concert that took place in Dallas, Texas on September 18, 1964.

In 1999, Eclipse Music Group released the first Elvis shaped compact disc, titled Elvis Presley Limited Edition Shaped CD. Tunzi provided the liner notes for this release.

Tunzi produced a DVD starring Elvis Presley and Frank Sinatra in 2000, titled Welcome Home Elvis and in 2001 started a series of DVD videos titled Hot Shots & Cool Clips, which is presently at eight volumes. The Welcome Home Elvis release was one of the first independent Elvis Presley video releases on the DVD format. The Hot Shots & Cool Clips series has featured newsreel, press conference, concert and candid footage of Elvis Presley throughout his career.  The website elvisondvdcd.de stated when discussing the third volume in the Hot Shots & Cool Clips series that "Joe Tunzi today is one of a very select group of people who go through obscure archives, searching high and low for undiscovered, rare footage. What he turns up with simply is breathtaking each and every time. On this volume he has collected some of the most rarest footage ever."

Tunzi also produced a DVD titled Young Man of The Nation on Elvis Presley being bestowed as one of the Ten Outstanding Young Men In America in 1970 by the United States Junior Chamber of Congress (Jaycees). The name of the award was later changed to the Ten Outstanding Young Americans.

In 2001, Tunzi released a compact disc titled Elvis, America The Beautiful, as part of a book package featuring a book of the same name. This set was also sold through Time-Life. Although the set was conceived prior to the September 11 attacks in the United States, the sales of this book / CD combination spiked in the aftermath of that tragic event as several thousand sets were sold.

In 2007, Tunzi collaborated with Sony / BMG on the budget CD title Country's Golden Hits, a ten track title featuring musical selections from the likes of Mac Davis, Sonny James, Kris Kristofferson, Johnny Cash, The Oak Ridge Boys, Floyd Cramer, Tammy Wynette, Waylon Jennings, Dolly Parton and Charlie Rich. Initially Tunzi sold this compact disc through his own website but later on it was sold through other outlets including Tuesday Morning. Most of the songs featured on this compact disc were songs that Elvis Presley had considered recording at some point.

In 2012, Tunzi co-produced with Joseph Pirzada of the United Kingdom based Memphis Recording Service label a compact disc featuring the March 25, 1961 benefit concert that Elvis performed at Bloch Arena in Pearl Harbor, Hawaii for the construction of the USS Arizona Memorial. The compact disc, titled Elvis Presley: Such A Night - In Pearl Harbor also featured the March 18, 1961 Elvis Salutes The USS Arizona radio program that was broadcast on a local Hawaiian radio station a week prior to the benefit concert.

Research
In August, 2002, Tunzi was one of the first to properly document and correct the erroneous photo credits attributed to the cover of Elvis Presley's first self-titled RCA Records vinyl album. The album, Elvis Presley (album) only originally credited the photographs used to photographer William Popsie Randolph. However, this credit line actually only applied to the photographs used on the back cover. The series of four photos found on the back cover were taken in New York at RCA on December 1, 1955. The front cover, an iconic picture of Elvis Presley performing in concert at the Fort Homer W. Hesterly Armory in Tampa, Florida on July 31, 1955 was actually photographed by William V. "Red" Robertson of Robertson & Fresch. Tunzi was quoted in the Tampa Tribune newspaper as saying, "Forget about Popsie. Popsie did not take that photo."

 Photograph archives and licensing 
Photographs from Tunzi's archives have appeared in numerous compact disc and vinyl reissues of Presley's music beginning with the 1994 compact disc reissues of Elvis and Raised on Rock. Other notable domestic releases to feature his photographs include Walk a Mile in My Shoes: The Essential '70s Masters, An Afternoon in the Garden, Platinum: A Life In Music, Today, Tomorrow, and Forever, The Complete Elvis Presley Masters and the 2016 sixty compact disc boxed set, The RCA Albums Collection. From an international standpoint, Tunzi has also supplied photographs for a number of releases outside the United States, including the Denmark-based Follow That Dream Collectors' Label and the 1999 Japanese Bertelsmann Music Group Funhouse ten compact disc release Elvis Presley - Complete Singles Collection. (BMG DRF 7101/10) In 2000, Tunzi was credited with supplying a photo in the United Kingdom two compact disc set, Elvis Presley - The 50 Greatest Hits. In virtually every domestic and international Elvis Presley release in which Tunzi licensed photographs, he was acknowledged in print somewhere throughout the packaging of the release. Of course, there are some exceptions, such as the 1999 budget compact disc release, Elvis Presley - It's Christmas Time, which was simply a reissue of the 1970 RCA Camden album Elvis' Christmas Album with a new title and different photo artwork. Additionally, photographs from his archives have appeared in Time, People and TV Guide.

In 1999, Tunzi supplied photographs for a volume of Time Life's The Elvis Presley Collection titled Treasures 1970-1976.

Tunzi is acknowledged for supplying images, including the album cover of Presley's 1973 Billboard number one album, Aloha from Hawaii Via Satellite for the 2004 book by Hamish Champ titled 100 Best Selling Albums of the 70s.
 
A photograph from Tunzi's photo agency has been featured inside the Valley View Casino Center in San Diego, California. In fact, Tunzi's name is also represented on the wall of The Valley View Casino Center below the photograph. The Valley View Casino Center was formerly named the San Diego Sports Arena. Elvis performed at the San Diego Sports Arena on three occasions. These were on November 15, 1970, April 26, 1973 and April 24, 1976.

Tunzi supplied the Robertson & Fresch photograph that was used for the cover of Presley's first album for a 2006 article in The Pasco Tribune, a section of The Tampa Tribune titled "Group Wants Creative Industries Business In Armory" and a 2011 article in the Tampa Tribune titled "Armory Shook Up History of Tampa".

Tunzi supplied photographs for the 2012 film documentary about songwriter Doc Pomus,  titled AKA Doc Pomus. Pomus had co-written several notable songs recorded by Elvis Presley, including "Viva Las Vegas", "A Mess of Blues", "Surrender", "Kiss Me Quick", "Little Sister", "(Marie's The Name) His Latest Flame", "She's Not You", "Suspicion", "Night Rider", "(It's a) Long Lonely Highway", and "Girl Happy".

Tunzi also supplied photographs of The Beatles for Chuck Gunderson's 2013 publication, Some Fun Tonight! The Backstage Story of How The Beatles Rocked America: The Historic Tours of 1964-1966, a two-volume tome detailing The Beatles' North American tours over the course of three years.Some Fun Tonight! The Backstage Story of How The Beatles Rocked America: The Historic Tours of 1964-1966 Volume 2: 1965-1966, Gunderson Media, 2013, Chuck Gunderson, Page 312

In 2014, Tunzi was acknowledged for supplying photographs of Presley for the Helen Maxwell book, Inside Beverly Hills PD. Elvis is known to have befriended many police officers across the United States during his lifetime.

In 2014 Sony Legacy released an eight compact disc / two DVD set on recording Presley made for the 1970 Metro-Goldwyn-Mayer motion picture, Elvis: That's the Way It Is. Tunzi supplied photos for this set. In fact, one of his photos was used in a review of the box set in The Boston Globe newspaper.

For the 2014 publication, Elvis Presley, A Southern Life, by Joel Williamson, Tunzi again licensed photos of Elvis throughout his career.

A photograph from Tunzi's archives was used initially uncredited twice in the Denny Tedesco directed film, The Wrecking Crew. The photograph was taken on June 23, 1968 at United Western Recorders and featured Presley along with session musicians Tommy Tedesco and Mike Deasy during sessions for the 1968 TV program Elvis. Additionally, that same photo along with two other photographs of Presley from the same recording sessions were used initially uncredited in the Ken Sharp book Sound Explosion! Inside L.A.'s Studio Factory With The Wrecking Crew. One of these photos was initially used by Tunzi as the cover photo for his 1993 publication, Elvis Sessions, The Recorded Music of Elvis Aron Presley 1953-1977.

Tunzi supplied photographs for the 2015 Follow That Dream Collectors' Label publication, Elvis Presley - Change of Habit.

One of Tunzi's photos was used for the U.S. cover of the 2015 compact disc and vinyl album release of If I Can Dream- Elvis Presley with the Royal Philharmonic Orchestra. This album topped the charts in a number of countries, including the United Kingdom and Australia. Both Tunzi and Daryl Restly were credited with supplying this photograph. Additionally, Tunzi and Restly supplied all of the photographs used in the U.S. pressing of the album, including the back cover, the compact disc jewel case inlay and the photos interspersed throughout the liner notes. A different album cover was used in the United Kingdom release of the album, although the aforementioned photos supplied by Tunzi and Restly were used in the United Kingdom pressing's liner notes. Tunzi and Restly's photos were also used on pressings outside the U.S., including the Australian, Japanese and Danish pressings of the album. Tunzi and Restly also supplied the photo that was used as a poster included in a deluxe box set released in the United Kingdom. A larger sized version of this poster was also sold in the United States with the vinyl album and compact disc as well as individually through a select retailer. An alternate photo was supplied by Tunzi and Restly for the November 27, 2015 Black Friday Record Store Day exclusive vinyl 45 RPM single "If I Can Dream" / "Anything That's Part Of You." Tunzi and Restly also supplied the cover photo that was used for a radio program compact disc distributed by Joyride Media to various radio outlets to promote If I Can Dream, which was narrated by Anthony DeCurtis and featured interviews with Priscilla Presley. Lastly, Tunzi and Restly were credited in a book of sheet music published by Hal Leonard featuring the songs found on the album If I Can Dream.

Tunzi and Restly were credited in the 2016 Sony Legacy sixty compact disc set titled Elvis Presley - The Album Collection for supplying photographs in the book that accompanied the set. This set featured compact disc replicas of fifty-seven albums issued during Presley's lifetime as well as three additional discs featuring rarities that have since been issued posthumously.

Tunzi was thanked for the "kind use of valuable photographs and memorabilia" in the 2016 Memphis Recording Service three compact disc set, Elvis, Live In The 50's - The Complete Concert Recordings. Tunzi was again acknowledged for the "kind use of valuable photographs and memorabilia" in the 2016 Memphis Recording Service two compact disc release, Elvis Presley - The Complete Works 1953-1955.

In the 2016 Grove Press publication written by Marc Myers, Anatomy Of A Song: The Oral History of 45 Hits That Changed Rock, R&B And Pop, both Tunzi and Restly are credited for supplying photographs.

Tunzi supplied photographs and documents for the 2016 Sara Schmidt book, Happiness Is Seeing The Beatles - Beatlemania In St. Louis and was acknowledged by Schmidt in her book for doing so.

In the 2018 HBO / Sony Pictures Television two part film, Elvis Presley - The Searcher, Joseph A. Tunzi / JAT Publishing supplied both photographs and archival film footage that was used throughout the documentary.

Tunzi supplied photographs for the April 21, 2018 Record Store Day release by Sony Legacy Recordings, titled Elvis Presley - The King In The Ring. This two LP vinyl set features both informal (sit-down) shows taped on June 27, 1968 (6PM and 8PM) for Elvis' 1968 Singer Presents...ELVIS NBC television special. This set was later reissued in November 2018.

In July, 2018, the Denmark based Follow That Dream collectors' label issued their first three compact disc set detailing the Viva Las Vegas recording sessions. Tunzi supplied photographs for this set and was acknowledged for doing so.

In August, 2018, Sony Legacy Recordings released the album, Elvis Presley - Where No One Stands Alone (album), which featured new backing instrumentation and vocals from a number of vocalists who once worked with Elvis Presley, including Darlene Love, Cissy Houston, The Imperials and former members of J.D. Sumner & The Stamps Quartet. This album featured a duet between Elvis and his daughter Lisa Marie Presley on the album's title track. Joseph A. Tunzi provided photographs for this album and was initially not credited though this will later be rectified in later pressings of the album.

In November 2018, Sony Legacy Recordings released the five compact disc / two Blu-ray disc box set titled Elvis Presley, '68 Comeback Special - 50th Anniversary Edition. This set compiled both the audio and the video pertaining to Elvis Presley's 1968 Singer Presents...Elvis NBC television special. Tunzi supplied photographs and documents for the set, which included an eighty-page booklet in which he is acknowledged for his contributions to the set.

The April 13, 2019 Record Store Day 2 LP vinyl release by Sony Legacy Recordings of Elvis Presley, Live At The International Hotel, Las Vegas, Nevada - August 23, 1969 featured photographs supplied by Joseph A. Tunzi / JAT Publishing. The concert recording featured on this double-album was previously unreleased in its entirety. Tunzi also supplied photographs for the 11 compact disc box set titled Elvis, Live 1969, featuring the eleven multi-track concert recordings Elvis made between August 21, 1969 and August 26, 1969 in the Showroom Internationale at the International Hotel in Las Vegas, Nevada.

In 2019, Joseph A. Tunzi / JAT Publishing supplied photographs to the Bear Family Records release, The Elvis Presley Connection Volume 1. Tunzi also supplied photographs (including the cover photo) and was acknowledged in the Bear Family Records release, The Elvis Presley Connection Volume 2, which was released in January 2020.

Tunzi was acknowledged in the 2019 Memphis Recording Service 4 CD release, Elvis, Made In Germany - The Complete Private Recordings for the "kind use of valuable photographs and memorabilia."

In November 2019, Sony Legacy Recordings issued the two LP vinyl set, Elvis Presley - American Sound 1969 Highlights for Black Friday (shopping) Record Store Day. Tunzi supplied photographs for this release. Earlier that same year, the Follow That Dream collectors' label issued a five compact disc set titled Elvis Presley - American Sound 1969. This set too also featured photographs from Joseph A. Tunzi / JAT Publishing. These two sets featured recordings Elvis Presley made in January and February 1969 at American Sound Studio in Memphis, Tennessee.

The Sony Legacy Recordings set, From Elvis In Nashville, released in both a four compact disc and a two LP vinyl set in November 2020, featured photographs provided by Joseph A. Tunzi / JAT Publishing and Daryl W. Restly. This release celebrated the fiftieth anniversary of Elvis recording nearly forty masters at historic RCA Studio B in Nashville, Tennessee during recording sessions in June and September 1970. The photographs that Tunzi and Restly supplied were primarily taken of Elvis as he arrived outside RCA Studio B in June 1970.

Tunzi supplied photographs of Elvis Presley and Tom Jones in which Presley can be seen wearing a 18 carat Corum Buckingham wristwatch, to the auction house, Sworders Fine Art Auctioneers in November 2020. The auction house was putting up the original watch for auction, as it had been gifted to Richard Davis, a member of Presley's entourage.

In 2020, Robert Gordon (writer and filmmaker) put out an updated and revised twenty-fifth anniversary version of his 1995 book, It Came From Memphis. In the updated version, JAT Publishing supplied a photo of singer, songwriter, musician and record producer Dan Penn and American Sound Studio owner Don Crews.

In 2021, Tunzi was acknowledged in the United Kingdom based Memphis Recording Service 3 CD and booklet release, Elvis Summer Festival 1970 - The Rehearsals for his "invaluable assistance during production." Later that same year, Tunzi was also credited in the Memphis Recording Service 3 CD and booklet release, Las Vegas International Presents Elvis - The First Engagements 1969-'70 again for his "invaluable assistance during production." Tunzi also was credited for his "invaluable assistance during production" on the 2021 Memphis Recording Service 2 CD and cassette release, Las Vegas International Presents Elvis - September 1970.

Tunzi and Daryl W. Restly supplied footage of Elvis Presley arriving at the airport in Honolulu, Hawaii on March 25, 1961 for the Tim Gray / World War II Foundation film, Elvis And The USS Arizona which premiered on PBS stations throughout the United States on November 6, 2021. The film was narrated by Jim Nantz and Kyle Chandler. This footage amounted to around 45 seconds. Elvis was travelling to Hawaii to perform a benefit concert for the construction of the USS Arizona Memorial later that same evening at Bloch Arena and to make his eighth motion picture, Paramount Pictures' Blue Hawaii, a Hal B. Wallis Production.

Tunzi and Restly also supplied photographs for the Sony Legacy four compact disc set and two vinyl LP set, Elvis, Back In Nashville that was released on November 12, 2021. This set covered Elvis' recording sessions from March 1971 through June 1971 at RCA Studio B in Nashville, Tennessee.

Tunzi supplied three photographs from August 27, 1965 of the night Elvis Presley met The Beatles at his 565 Perugia Way home in Bel Air, California and was interviewed in chapter five, which was titled Elvis, The Beatles, Bel Air, and the Photo Discovery of a Lifetime in the Jeremy Louwerse and Tom Weitzel book, The Beatles In Los Angeles - Yesterday, Today And Tomorrow. A recent photo of Tunzi himself also appeared in the book as well. Tunzi was also credited on-screen for the use of one of the photos in a brief story about the photos that was part of the television program, Extra (American TV program), in which Louwerse and Weitzel were interviewed. Louwerse and Weitzel were also interviewed at Amoeba Music in Hollywood, California and spoke briefly about the photos for a story for KNBC Channel 4 in Los Angeles, California.

In 2022, Tunzi and Restly were acknowledged for their "invaluable assistance during production" of the Memphis Recording Service release, Elvis Like A Black Tornado - Live At Boston Garden 1971. Tunzi was again credited in the 2022 Memphis Recording Service release, Las Vegas International Presents Elvis Now 1971 for his "invaluable assistance during production."

Tunzi was acknowledged for supplying photographs for the 2023 physical release of the Sony Legacy 6 compact disc / 1 Blu Ray box set on Elvis Presley's 1972 Golden Globe winning Metro-Goldwyn-Mayer documentary motion picture, Elvis On Tour Tunzi and Restly were acknowledged for their "invaluable assistance during production" of the 2023 Memphis Recording Service release, Las Vegas Hilton Presents Elvis - Opening Night 1972.

 Cited works And additional contributions 
Peter Guralnick and Ernst Jørgensen acknowledged Tunzi's work in the introduction to their 1999 publication Elvis Day By Day: The Definitive Record of His Life and Music by lauding "Joe Tunzi's indefatigable photographic and discographical research Elvis Sessions II among others."Julie Mundy, in her book, Elvis Fashion praised Tunzi's work by writing, "with the visually stunning publications from Joe Tunzi, which are certainly the best source for concert images." In Mike Eder's book Elvis Music FAQ: All That's Left To Know About The King's Recorded Works, Eder acknowledged Tunzi with special thanks "for my start" as a writer.

Ernst Jørgensens' book, Elvis Presley: A Life In Music - The Complete Recording Sessions, gratefully acknowledged Tunzi, among others, "for the use of illustrations in this book." Several of Tunzi's works, including Elvis Sessions: The Recorded Music of Elvis Aron Presley, 1953-1977, Elvis '69: The Return and Elvis '73: Hawaiian Spirit were cited in the bibliography to Last Train To Memphis: The Rise of Elvis Presley, volume one of Peter Guralnick's two part biography on Presley. In Careless Love: The Unmaking of Elvis Presley, the second volume of Guralnick's tome on Elvis Presley, several more works by Tunzi were cited in his bibliography, including Elvis Sessions II: The Recorded Music of Elvis Aron Presley, 1953-1977, Elvis: Highway 51 South, Memphis, Tennessee, Elvis: Standing Room Only, 1970-1975, Elvis '69: The Return, Elvis '73: Hawaiian Spirit, Photographs and Memories, Tiger Man: Elvis '68, and Elvis, The Lost Photographs, 1948-1969. Additionally, Tunzi also supplied several photos for Careless Love: The Unmaking Of Elvis Presley.

Two of Tunzi's books were cited in the Gillian G. Gaar book, 100 Things Elvis Fans Should Know And Do Before They Die. These two books were Elvis No. 1 The Complete Chart History Of Elvis Presley and Elvis Sessions III The Recorded Music of Elvis Aron Presley 1953-1977.

In 2008, Tunzi provided audio clips of music and interviews to Joyride Media for use in their radio special on Elvis' 1968 NBC television special, "Singer Presents Elvis." Likewise, in 2009, Tunzi again provided audio clips of music and interviews to Joyride Media for usage in their radio special celebrating the 40th anniversary of Elvis' 1969 album, From Elvis in Memphis.

In 2011, Tunzi contributed the introduction to the Overlook Books publication, Elvis In Vegas.

In Trevor Simpson's 2015 Follow That Dream Collectors' Label publication, Elvis, The Best Of British - The RCA Years 1959-1960, Simpson noted that "whilst there are too many to mention extensively, the various books in my collection written by Adam Victor, Colin Escott, Joe Tunzi, Jerry Osborne, Greil Marcus, Ger Rijff and Nick Tosches have all been research tools of the highest order."

Tunzi served as the associate producer for the 2016 Boxcar Enterprises publication, Elvis On Television 1956-1960. Tunzi also was thanked for the use of his "valuable photographs and memorabilia" on the 2016 two compact disc Memphis Recording Service set, Elvis On Television 1956-1960 - The Complete Sound Recordings. Tunzi was again acknowledged for the "kind use of photographs and memorabilia" on the 2018 Memphis Recording Service five CD set, Elvis, The Complete '50s Movie Masters & Session Recordings.

In 2018, the Steve Binder written book, Comeback '68 Elvis - The Story Of The Elvis Special acknowledged Joseph Tunzi with the following, "Special thanks to Joe Tunzi for his belief in this project." Joe had previously published two books on the 1968 Singer Presents...ELVIS NBC television special. The first of which was Tiger Man - Elvis '68 in 1997 (which Steve Binder wrote the introduction) and Elvis '68 At 40: Retrospective, which was written by Binder and published by Tunzi in 2008. In 2022, Binder did an interview about a reprint of his 2018 book in which he acknowledged Tunzi.

The 2008 title 68 At 40: Retrospective by Steve Binder that was published by JAT Publishing was listed amongst the works cited in Eric Wolfson's 2020 book Elvis Presley's From Elvis In Memphis (33 1/3).

Tunzi was thanked for his "invaluable assistance during production" in the 2021 United Kingdom based Memphis Recording Service two compact disc release, Elvis, Mono To Stereo - The Complete RCA Studio Masters 1956. Tunzi has also contributed to many other Memphis Recording Service releases, including the 2006 release, The Rise of Elvis Presley Volume 2 - 1955 (co-producer), both the regular release and the limited edition release of the 2007 set, Tupelo's Own Elvis Presley (co-producer), the 2007 My Baby Left Me / So Glad You're Mine / Don't Be Cruel HMV vinyl and CD Elvis Presley singles (co-producer), the 2007 release of Elvis Presley - New York - RCA Studio 1 - The Complete Sessions (co-producer and acknowledged for the use of photographs), the 2011 release of The Complete Louisiana Hayride Archives 1954-1956 (photographs and memorabilia use as well as the Tunzi remix of the song Maybellene, the 2012 release, Greatest Live Hits Of The 50s (photograph usage), and the 2019 Back In Living Stereo release (associated producer). 

Awards and accolades
Tunzi has received numerous accolades for his embodiment of work from the arts and entertainment field.

Tunzi has won a gold publishing award from the IAPHC - The Graphic Professional Resource Network (www.iaphc.org) for his work. He also has been presented with four letters from four former U.S. presidents. These include letters from Jimmy Carter, Bill Clinton, George W. Bush and Donald Trump acknowledging his work.1964: The Year That... Changed America & Me, JAT Publishing, 2019, 9781888464-33-7, Joseph A. Tunzi, page 1

In 2015, Tunzi was nominated for the first time and elected to the William Howard Taft High School (Chicago) Hall of Fame. Tunzi was a 1971 graduate of William Howard Taft High School.

Tunzi has been included in several noteworthy lists, one of which is notable people from Chicago, Illinois.

Selected bibliographyThe First Elvis Video Price And Reference Guide (1988)Elvis, Encore Performance (Chicago 1972) (1990)Elvis '69, The Return (1991)Elvis '73, Hawaiian Spirit (1992)Elvis Sessions, The Recorded Music Of Elvis Aron Presley 1953-1977 (1993)Elvis, Standing Room Only 1970-1975 (1994)
Elvis, Highway 51 South Memphis, Tennessee (1995)Elvis, The Lost Photographs 1948-1969 (1995)Elvis Sessions II, The Recorded Music Of Elvis Aron Presley 1953-1977 (Revised and Expanded Edition) (1996)Tiger Man; Elvis '68 (1997)Photographs & Memories (1998)Elvis Number One, The Complete Chart History Of Elvis Presley (2000)Beatles '65 (2002)Elvis Sessions III, The Recorded Music Of Elvis Aron Presley 1953-1977 (Revised and Expanded Edition) (2004)ELVIS 68 at 40: Retrospective (2008) (A 20th Anniversary J.A.T. Full-Color Book)The Definitive Vinyl Artwork of Elvis Presley 1956-1977 (2015)1964: The Year That... Changed America & Me (2019)The Comprehensive USA Artwork Guide To Elvis Presley Tapes'' (RCA Reel-To-Reel, 8-Track & Cassette) (2022)

References

External links
 JAT Publishing About The Author

1953 births
Living people
American male writers
People from Chicago